This is a list of defunct airlines of Costa Rica.

See also
List of airlines of Costa Rica
List of airports in Costa Rica

References

Costa Rica
Airlines
Airlines, Defunct
Airlines